The term purple crocodile (Dutch: Paarse krokodil) originates from a 2004 television advertisement by the Dutch insurance company OHRA promoting their lack of red tape. The purple crocodile has since become a metaphor for bureaucracy in the Netherlands.

Description of the advertisement
The advertisement consists of a single sketch in which a mother and her daughter appear at the reception desk of a public swimming pool. The mother explains to the receptionist that the previous day her daughter left her inflatable purple crocodile at the swimming pool.

The receptionist hands the mother a form which must be filled out on both sides and handed in the following day between 9 and 10 AM, while the purple crocodile which her daughter had lost is seen standing in a corner of the reception desk. The mother then points at the purple crocodile and says that "it's right there." The receptionist says in a sneering tone "yes, it is right there" but takes no action.

Appearance in Dutch law
A 2006 law Wijzigingswet belastingwetten ter vermindering van administratieve lasten aimed at reducing red tape has the official shortened name Wijzigingsplan «Paarse krokodil» (Amendment «Purple crocodile»)

References

Advertising characters
Dutch words and phrases
Fictional crocodilians
Mascots introduced in 2005